Bésame Cosmetics, Inc. is a color cosmetics/makeup company founded in 2004 and based in Los Angeles, California. It was founded by makeup historian and author Gabriela Hernandez, who is the current C.E.O. Bésame Cosmetics recreates makeup shades, packaging, and products from the 1920s-1970s. They are known for their cake mascara, several collaborations with the Walt Disney Company, and creating the lipstick worn by actress Hayley Atwell on the ABC Marvel show Agent Carter.

Description  
Gabriela Hernandez and her husband Fergus Hernandez started the company online in 2004. The first product created and sold by the brand online was lipstick in the shade "Bésame Red." In 2005, they opened a boutique shop opened in Burbank, California. The cosmetics line offered there included lipsticks, face powders, rouges, brushes, and more, all based on historical makeup that Hernandez had in her personal antique collection. The company now has a focus on refillable cosmetics and sustainable packaging.

External links 

American companies established in 2004
Cosmetics companies of the United States
Privately held companies based in California